Pimelea brevistyla is a species of flowering plant in the family Thymelaeaceae and is endemic to the south-west of Western Australia. It is a shrub with narrowly egg-shaped leaves arranged in opposite pairs, and head-like racemes of white, tube-shaped flowers surrounded by yellowish involucral bracts.

Description
Flowering occurs from August to October.

Taxonomy
Pimelea brevistyla  was first formally described in 1984 by Barbara Lynette Rye in the journal Nuytsia from specimens collected in Glen Forrest in 1983. The specific epithet (brevistyla) means "short style".

In a later edition of the journal Nuytsia, Rye described two subspecies of P. brevistyla and the names are accepted by the Australian Plant Census:

Distribution and habitat
Subspecies brevistyla mainly grows in lateritic or granitic soil and is found on the Darling Range between Glen Forrest and Serpentine Falls in the Jarrah Forest and Swan Coastal Plain, and subspecies minor in sandy soil from Wubin to Hyden in the Avon Wheatbelt and Mallee bioregions of south-western Western Australia.

Conservation status
Both subspecies of P. brevistyla are listed as "not threatened" by the Government of Western Australia Department of Biodiversity, Conservation and Attractions.

References

brevistyla
Endemic flora of Western Australia
Malvales of Australia
Plants described in 1984
Taxa named by Barbara Lynette Rye